Emir Dautović (born 5 February 1995) is a Slovenian football defender who plays for SV Tillmitsch in Austria.

Club career
He began his career in Trbovlje, where he played for Rudar Trbovlje youth selections until 2010, when he transferred to Maribor. Dautović, who plays as a central defender, was regarded as one of the biggest talents of the Slovenian football in 2012. He made his professional debut for OFK Beograd in Jelen SuperLiga home win against Mladost Lučani on 23 November 2014.

International career
Dautović was a member of the Slovenia national under-19 football team. He appeared with the under-17 squad at the 2012 UEFA European Under-17 Football Championship, where he played on all three group matches for his side, receiving one red card in the process.

Notes

References

External links
 
 NZS profile 

1995 births
Living people
People from Trbovlje
Association football defenders
Slovenian footballers
Slovenian expatriate footballers
Expatriate footballers in Cyprus
Slovenian expatriate sportspeople in Cyprus
Expatriate footballers in Serbia
Slovenian expatriate sportspeople in Serbia
Expatriate footballers in Belgium
Slovenian expatriate sportspeople in Belgium
Expatriate footballers in Austria
Slovenian expatriate sportspeople in Austria
Royal Excel Mouscron players
Belgian Pro League players
OFK Beograd players
Fortuna Sittard players
Serbian SuperLiga players
Eerste Divisie players
Expatriate footballers in the Netherlands
Slovenian expatriate sportspeople in the Netherlands
Slovenian PrvaLiga players
Slovenian Second League players
NK Ankaran players
NK Radomlje players
Slovenia youth international footballers